Cream is a DJ mix album released by Sandra Collins, in 2001. It was released on the Kinetic Records label.

Track listing
"Solid Ground (Markus Schulz Tribal Mix)" - Carissa Mondavi 
"Robot Funk 2001 (Cimmera's Space at Amnesia Dub)" - Manhattan
"Momentum" - Lastmanstanding
"Warp" - 16th Element
"Chaos Engine" - Traveller & Quest
"My Mind Is Going" - Piece Process
"Derangement of the Senses" - Voyager
"Do You Hear It? (Bet Two For Good Mix)" - Chiller Twist
"All I Want (Mark O Tool Mix)" - JBN
"Fouk (Maurice & Noble's Fouked Up Union Mix)" - T-Empo
"Faith Delivers (Union Main Room Mix)" - Maurice & Noble featuring Jane Hadley

Personnel
Sandra Collins - Mixing

References

Sandra Collins albums
2001 albums
Kinetic Records albums